Bingara Gorge is part of Wilton in the Macarthur Region of New South Wales, Australia, in the Wollondilly Shire. The locality is a Country Club style development by Delfin. According to Delfin, Bingara Gorge covers an area 450 hectares which will allow around 1,165 dwellings and home to a population of 3,500 residents. As of July, 2022, Bingara Gorge contains facilities for residents use only. The facilities include a gym, a golf shop, 2 tennis courts, a play area and 3 pools, all wrapped around by an 18-hole Graham Marsh designed golf course. A country club will also be built in the near future. The development is said to be completed by 2024.

Bingara Gorge also has a town centre, which contains a small supermarket, Chinese restaurant, bakery, pharmacy & medical centre, nail salon, and liquor store. Bingara Gorge also has a primary school and childcare centre.

In May 2021, Metro Property Development acquired Bingara Gorge from Lendlease for $220 million.

It is located adjacent to the Hume Highway.

References

Localities in New South Wales
Wollondilly Shire